Crossota rufobrunnea is a species of hydrozoan.

References

Animals described in 2016
Rhopalonematidae